Andreja Lazović (born 4 August 1994) is a Serbian footballer. As of 2021, he plays for IMT Belgrade.

References

External links

Andreja Lazović at srbijafudbal.com

1994 births
Living people
Serbian footballers
Association football forwards
Serbian expatriate footballers
Expatriate footballers in Belarus
FK Čukarički players
FK BASK players
FK Sinđelić Beograd players
FK Mačva Šabac players
FK Smederevo players
FK Jagodina players
FC Gorodeya players
OFK Beograd players
OFK Bačka players
FK IMT players